The Tree Bride,  (2004) is a historical novel by Bharati Mukherjee.  It is the sequel to Desirable Daughters.

Plot introduction
The quiet brahmin girl from Bengal becomes a passionate resister of foreign rule, against the British Raj. The narrator discovers her ancestor's struggle for her land, whilst seeking to establish herself as an American citizen.

Publication history
 Hardcover — , published in August 2004 by Theia.
 Paperback — , published in August 2005 by Hyperion

External links
 The Tree Bride - Google Books
 Powell's review
 Chicago Sun Times review
 Boston Globe review
 DesiJournal review
 India Currents review
 Little India review

Historical novels
2004 American novels
Novels by Bharati Mukherjee
Novels set in India
Novels set in San Francisco